Operation Weserübung (9 April – 10 June 1940) was Germany's assault on Denmark and Norway during the Second World War and the opening operation of the Norwegian Campaign.

In the early morning of 9 April 1940 (Wesertag, "Weser Day"), Germany occupied Denmark and invaded Norway, ostensibly as a preventive manoeuvre against a planned, and openly discussed, French-British occupation of Norway known as Plan R 4 (actually developed as a response to any German aggression against Norway). After the occupation of Denmark (the Danish military was ordered to stand down as Denmark did not declare war with Germany), envoys of the Germans informed the governments of Denmark and Norway that the Wehrmacht had come to protect the countries' neutrality against Franco-British aggression. Significant differences in geography, location and climate between the two nations made the actual military operations very dissimilar.

The invasion fleet's nominal landing time, Weserzeit, was set to 05:15.

Background 

In the spring of 1939, the British Admiralty began to view Scandinavia as a potential theatre of war in a future conflict with Germany. The British government was reluctant to engage in another land conflict on the continent in the belief that would repeat the First World War. Therefore, the British began to consider a blockade strategy in an attempt to weaken Germany indirectly. German industry was heavily dependent on the import of iron ore from the northern Swedish mining district, and much of that ore was shipped through the northern Norwegian port of Narvik during the winter months. Control of the Norwegian coast would serve to tighten a blockade against Germany.

In October 1939, the chief of the German Kriegsmarine, Grand Admiral Erich Raeder, discussed with Adolf Hitler the danger posed by potential British bases in Norway and the possibility of Germany seizing those bases before the British could. The navy argued that possession of Norway would allow control of the nearby seas and serve as a platform for staging submarine operations against the United Kingdom. However, the other branches of the Wehrmacht were not interested, and Hitler issued a directive stating that the main effort would be a land offensive through the Low Countries.

Toward the end of November 1939, Winston Churchill, as a new member of the British War Cabinet, proposed the mining of Norwegian waters in Operation Wilfred. That would force the ore transports to travel through the open waters of the North Sea, where the Royal Navy could intercept them.

Churchill assumed that Wilfred would provoke a German response in Norway and that the Allies would then implement Plan R 4 and occupy Norway. Though later implemented, Operation Wilfred was initially rejected by Neville Chamberlain and Lord Halifax for fear of an adverse reaction among neutral nations like the United States. The start of the Winter War between the Soviet Union and Finland in November 1939 changed the strategic situation. Churchill again proposed his mining scheme but once again was denied.

In December 1939, the United Kingdom and France began serious planning for sending aid to Finland. Their plan called for a force to land in Narvik, in northern Norway, the main port for Swedish iron ore exports and then to take control of the Malmbanan railway line from Narvik to Luleå in Sweden on the shore of the Gulf of Bothnia. Conveniently, that would also allow the Allied forces to occupy the Swedish iron ore mining district. The plan received the support of both Chamberlain and Halifax. They were counting on the co-operation of Norway, which would alleviate some of the legal issues, but stern warnings issued to both Norway and Sweden by Germany resulted in strongly negative reactions in both Scandinavian countries. Planning for the expedition continued, but the justification for it was removed after the Moscow Peace Treaty between Finland and the Soviet Union had been signed in March 1940 and ended the Winter War.

Planning 
Following a meeting with Vidkun Quisling from Norway on December 14th, Hitler turned his attention to Scandinavia. Convinced of the threat posed by the Allies to the iron ore supply, Hitler ordered the Oberkommando der Wehrmacht (Armed Forces High Command; OKW) to begin preliminary planning for an invasion of Norway. The preliminary plan was named Studie Nord and called for only one army division.

Between 14 and 19 January, the Kriegsmarine developed an expanded version of this plan. It decided upon two key factors: surprise was essential to reduce the threat of Norwegian resistance (and British intervention), and faster German warships, rather than comparatively slow merchant ships, should be used as troop transports. That would allow all targets to be occupied simultaneously, which was impossible if transport ships were used since they travelled only slowly. The new plan called for a full army corps, including a mountain division, an airborne division, a motorized rifle brigade and two infantry divisions. The target objectives of the force were the Norwegian capital, Oslo, and other population centres: Bergen, Narvik, Tromsø, Trondheim, Kristiansand and Stavanger. The plan also called for the swift capture of the Kings of Denmark and Norway in the hope of triggering a rapid surrender.

On 21 February 1940, command of the operation was given to General Nikolaus von Falkenhorst. He had fought in Finland during the First World War and was familiar with Arctic warfare, but he would have command of only the ground forces, despite Hitler's desire to have a unified command.

The final plan was codenamed "Operation Weserübung" on 27 January 1940. The ground forces would be the XXI Army Corps, including the 3rd Mountain Division and five infantry divisions;none of the latter had yet been tested in battle. The first phase would consist of three divisions for the assault, with the remainder to follow in the next wave. Three companies of paratroopers would be used to seize airfields. The decision to also send the 2nd Mountain Division was made later.

Almost all U-boat operations in the Atlantic were to be stopped for the submarines to aid in the operation. All available submarines, including some training boats, were used as part of Operation Hartmut in support of Operation Weserübung.

Initially, the plan was to invade Norway and to gain control of Danish airfields by diplomatic means. However,  Hitler issued a new directive on 1 March that called for the invasion of both Norway and Denmark. That came at the insistence of the Luftwaffe to capture fighter bases and sites for air warning stations. The XXXI Corps, formed for the invasion of Denmark, consisted of two infantry divisions and the 11th motorized brigade. The entire operation would be supported by the X Air Corps, which consisted of some 1,000 aircraft of various types.

Preliminaries 

In February, the Royal Navy destroyer  boarded the German transport ship Altmark in Norwegian waters. That itself violated Norwegian neutrality. The Altmark rescued British prisoners-of-war, which also violated Norwegian neutrality since she was obliged to release them as soon as she entered neutral territory. Hitler regarded that response to German violation of Norwegian neutrality as a clear sign that the Allies were also willing to violate Norwegian neutrality. That made him become even more strongly committed to the invasion.

On 12 March, the United Kingdom decided to send an expeditionary force to Norway just as the Winter War was winding down. The expeditionary force began boarding on 13 March, but it was recalled and the operation cancelled because of the end of the Winter War. Instead, the British Cabinet voted to proceed with the mining operation in Norwegian waters, followed by troop landings.

The first German ships set sail for the invasion on 3 April. Two days later, the long-planned Operation Wilfred was put into action, and the Royal Navy detachment, led by the battlecruiser , left Scapa Flow to mine Norwegian waters. The mine fields were laid in the Vestfjorden in the early morning of 8 April. Operation Wilfred was over, but later that day, the destroyer , which detached on 7 April to search for a man lost overboard, was lost in action to the German heavy cruiser  and two destroyers belonging to the German invasion fleet.

On 9 April, the German invasion was under way, and the execution of Plan R 4 was promptly started.

Invasion of Denmark 

Strategically, Denmark's importance to Germany was as a staging area for operations in Norway. Considering its status as a minor nation bordering Germany, it was also seen as a country that would have to fall at some point. Given Denmark's position on the Baltic Sea, the country was also crucial for the control of naval and shipping access to major German and Soviet harbours.

At 04:00 on 9 April 1940, the German ambassador to Denmark, Cecil von Renthe-Fink, called the Danish Foreign Minister Peter Munch and requested a meeting with him. When the two men met 20 minutes later, Renthe-Fink declared that German troops were then moving in to occupy Denmark to protect the country from Franco-British attack. The German ambassador demanded that Danish resistance cease immediately and that contact be made between Danish authorities and the German armed forces. If the demands were not met, the Luftwaffe would bomb the capital, Copenhagen.

As the German demands were communicated, the first German advances had already been made, with forces landing by ferry in Gedser at 03:55 and moving north. German Fallschirmjäger (paratrooper) units had made unopposed landings and taken two airfields at Aalborg, the Storstrøm Bridge as well as the fortress of Masnedø, the latter being the first recorded attack in the world made by paratroopers.

At 04:20 local time, a reinforced battalion of German infantrymen from the 308th Regiment landed in Copenhagen harbour from the minelayer , quickly capturing the Danish garrison at the Citadel without encountering resistance. From the harbour, the Germans moved toward Amalienborg Palace to capture the Danish royal family. By the time the invasion forces arrived at the king's residence, the King's Royal Guard had been alerted and other reinforcements were on their way to the palace. The first German attack on Amalienborg was repulsed, giving Christian X and his ministers time to confer with the Danish Army chief General Prior. As the discussions were ongoing, several formations of Heinkel He 111 and Dornier Do 17 bombers roared over the city dropping leaflets headed, in Danish/Norwegian, OPROP! (proclamation).

At 05:25, two squadrons of German Messerschmitt Bf 110s attacked Værløse airfield on Zealand and neutralised the Danish Army Air Service by strafing. Despite Danish anti-aircraft fire, the German fighters destroyed ten Danish aircraft and seriously damaged another fourteen, thereby wiping out half of the entire Army Air Service.

Faced with the explicit threat of the Luftwaffe bombing the civilian population of Copenhagen, and with only General Prior in favour of fighting on, King Christian and the entire Danish government capitulated at approximately 06:00, in exchange for retaining political independence in domestic matters.

The invasion of Denmark lasted less than six hours and was the shortest military campaign conducted by the Germans during the war. The rapid Danish capitulation resulted in the uniquely-lenient occupation of Denmark, particularly until the summer of 1943, and in postponing the arrest and deportation of Danish Jews until nearly all of them were warned and on their way to refuge in neutral Sweden. In the end, 477 Danish Jews were deported, and 70 of them lost their lives, out of a pre-war total of Jews and half-Jews at a little over 8,000.

Invasion of Norway

Order of battle 

The operation's military headquarters was Hotel Esplanade in Hamburg, where orders were given to, among others, the air units involved in the invasion.

Norway was important to Germany for two primary reasons: as a base for naval units, including U-boats, to weaken Allied shipping in the North Atlantic, and to secure shipments of iron ore from Sweden through the port of Narvik. The long northern coastline was an excellent place to launch U-boat operations into the North Atlantic to attack British commerce. Germany was dependent on iron ore from Sweden and was worried, with justification, that the Allies would attempt to disrupt those shipments, 90% of which originating from Narvik.

The invasion of Norway was given to the XXI Army Corps under General Nikolaus von Falkenhorst and consisted of the following main units:
 69th Infantry Division
 163rd Infantry Division
 181st Infantry Division
 196th Infantry Division
 214th Infantry Division
 3rd Mountain Division

The initial invasion force was transported in several groups by ships of the Kriegsmarine:
 Heavy cruiser  and four destroyers with 1,700 troops to Trondheim
 Light cruiser , three torpedo boats, seven motor torpedo boats and Schnellboot mothership (Schnellbootbegleitschiff) Tsingtau with 1,100 troops to Kristiansand and Arendal
 Heavy cruiser , heavy cruiser Lützow, light cruiser , three torpedo boats and eight minesweepers with 2,000 troops to Oslo
 Four minesweepers with 150 troops to Egersund

Course of actions 

Shortly after noon on 8 April, the clandestine German troopship  was sunk off Lillesand by the Polish submarine , part of the Royal Navy's 2nd Submarine Flotilla. However, the news of the sinking reached the appropriate levels of officialdom in Oslo too late to do much more than trigger a limited, last-minute alert. Late in the evening of 8 April 1940, Kampfgruppe 5 was spotted by the Norwegian guard vessel . Pol III was fired at; her captain Leif Welding-Olsen became the first Norwegian killed in action during the invasion. German ships then sailed up the Oslofjord leading to the Norwegian capital, reaching the Drøbak Narrows (Drøbaksundet). 

In the early morning of 9 April, the gunners at Oscarsborg Fortress fired on the leading ship, Blücher, which had been illuminated by spotlights at about 04:15. Two of the fortress guns were 48-year-old German-made Krupp guns (nicknamed Moses and Aron) of  caliber. Within two hours, the badly damaged ship, unable to manoeuvre in the narrow fjord from multiple artillery and torpedo hits, sank with very heavy loss of life totalling 600–1,000 men. The threat from the fortress (and the mistaken belief that mines had contributed to the sinking) delayed the rest of the naval invasion group long enough for the Royal Family, the Cabinet and members of Parliament to be evacuated, along with the national treasury. On their flight northward by special train, the court encountered the Battle of Midtskogen and bombs at Elverum and Nybergsund. As the Norwegian king and his legitimate government were not captured, Norway never surrendered in a legal sense to the Germans, leaving the Quisling government illegitimate. The Norwegian government-in-exile based in London remained, therefore, an Allied nation in the war. 

At 7:06pm 5 Norwegian fighters were sent into battle to combat a wave of 70–80 enemy planes. German airborne troops landed at the Oslo airport Fornebu, Kristiansand airport Kjevik, and Sola Air Station – the latter constituting the first opposed paratrooper attack in history; coincidentally, among the Luftwaffe pilots landing at Kjevik was Reinhard Heydrich. Vidkun Quisling's radio-effected coup d'etat at 7.30pm on 9 April was another first. At 8.30pm the Norwegian destroyer  was attacked and sunk outside Stavanger by ten Junkers Ju 88 bombers, after it sank the German cargo ship . Roda was a carrying a clandestine cargo of anti-aircraft artillery and ammunition for the German invasion force. Bergen, Stavanger, Egersund, Kristiansand, Arendal, Horten, Trondheim and Narvik were attacked and occupied within 24 hours. Ineffective resistance by the Norwegian armoured coastal defence ships  and  took place at Narvik. Both ships were torpedoed and sunk with great loss of life. The First Battle of Narvik took place between the Royal Navy and the Kriegsmarine on 9 April. The German force took Narvik and landed the 2,000 mountain infantry, but a British naval counter-attack by the modernised battleship  and a flotilla of destroyers over several days succeeded in sinking all ten German destroyers once they ran out of fuel and ammunition. 

The towns Nybergsund, Elverum, Åndalsnes, Molde, Kristiansund N, Steinkjer, Namsos, Bodø, and Narvik were devastated by German bombing; some of them were tactically bombed, others terror-bombed. The main German land campaign advanced northward from Oslo with superior equipment; Norwegian soldiers with turn-of-the-century weapons, along with some British and French troops, stop invaders for a time before yielding; this was the first land combat between the British Army and the Wehrmacht in World War II. In the Second Naval Battle of Narvik, the Royal Navy defeated the Kriegsmarine on 13 April. 

In land battles at Narvik, Norwegian and Allied forces under General Carl Gustav Fleischer achieved the first major tactical victory against the Wehrmacht in WWII. German forces then overpowered Norwegian troops at Gratangen. The King and his cabinet evacuated from Molde to Tromsø on 29 April, and the Allies evacuated from Åndalsnes on 1 May. Resistance in Southern Norway then came to an end. 

Hegra Fortress continued to resist German attacks until 5 Mayit was of Allied propaganda importance, like Narvik. King Haakon, Crown Prince Olav, and the Cabinet Nygaardsvold left from Tromsø 7 June aboard the British cruiser  to represent Norway in exile. The King would return to Oslo on that exact date five years later. Crown Princess Märtha and children, denied asylum in her native Sweden, later left from Petsamo, Finland, to live in exile in the United States. The Norwegian Army in mainland Norway capitulated on 10 June 1940, two months after Wesertag. That made Norway the occupied country that had withstood a German invasion for the longest time before succumbing. Despite the surrender of the main Norwegian forces, the Royal Norwegian Navy and other armed forces continued fighting the Germans abroad and at home until the German capitulation on 8 May 1945.

In the far north, Norwegian, French and Polish troops, supported by the Royal Navy and the Royal Air Force (RAF), fought against the Germans over the control of the Norwegian harbour Narvik, important for the year-round export of Swedish iron ore. The Germans were driven out of Narvik on 28 May, but the deteriorating situation on the European continent made the Allied troops withdraw in Operation Alphabet, and on 9 June, the Germans recaptured Narvik, which was also now abandoned by civilians because of massive Luftwaffe bombing.

Encircling of Sweden and Finland 

Operation Weserübung did not include a military assault on neutral Sweden because there was no strategic reason. By holding Norway, the Danish straits and most of the shores of the Baltic Sea, the Third Reich encircled Sweden from the north, the west and the south. In the east, there was the Soviet Union, the successor of Sweden's and Finland's archenemy, Russia, on friendly terms with Hitler under the terms of the Molotov–Ribbentrop Pact. A small number of Finnish volunteers helped the Norwegian Army against Germans in an ambulance unit.

Swedish and Finnish trade was dependent on the Kriegsmarine, and Germany put pressure on neutral Sweden to permit transit of military goods and soldiers on leave. On 18 June 1940, an agreement was reached. Soldiers were to travel unarmed and not be part of unit movements. A total of 2.14 million German soldiers, as well as more than 100,000 German military railway carriages, crossed Sweden until that traffic was suspended on 20 August 1943.

On 19 August 1940, Finland agreed to grant access to its territory for the Wehrmacht, with the agreement signed on 22 September. Initially for transit of troops and military equipment to and from northernmost Norway but soon it included minor bases along the transit road that eventually would grow in preparation for Operation Barbarossa.

Nuremberg Trials 
The 1941 Anglo-Soviet invasion of Iran, and the 1940 German invasion of Norway have been argued to be preemptive, with the German defense in the Nuremberg trials in 1946 arguing that Germany was "compelled to attack Norway by the need to forestall an Allied invasion and that her action was therefore preemptive". The German defence was to attempt to refer to Plan R 4 and its predecessors. However, it was determined that Germany had discussed invasion plans as early as 3 October 1939 in a memo from Admiral Raeder to Alfred Rosenberg whose subject was "gaining bases in Norway". Raeder had begun by asking questions such as "Can bases be gained by military force against Norway's will, if it is impossible to carry this out without fighting?" Norway was vital to Germany as a transport route for iron ore from Sweden, a supply that the United Kingdom was determined to stop. One British plan was to go through Norway and occupy cities in Sweden. An Allied invasion was ordered on 12 March, and the Germans intercepted radio traffic setting 14 March as deadline for the preparation. Peace in Finland interrupted the Allied plans.

Two diary entries by Alfred Jodl dated 13 and 14 March did not indicate any high-level awareness of the Allied plan but also that Hitler was actively considering putting Weserübung into operation. The first said, "Führer does not give order yet for 'Weser Exercise'. He is still looking for an excuse". The second: "Führer has not yet decided what reason to give for Weser Exercise". It was not until 2 April 1940 that German preparations were completed and the Naval Operational Order for Weserübung was issued on 4 April 1940. The new Allied plans were Wilfred and Plan R 4. The plan was to provoke a German reaction by laying mines in Norwegian waters, and once Germany showed signs of taking action, UK troops would occupy Narvik, Trondheim, and Bergen and launch a raid on Stavanger to destroy Sola airfield. However, "the mines were not laid until the morning of 8 April, by which time the German ships were advancing up the Norwegian coast". The International Military Tribunal at Nuremberg determined that no Allied invasion was imminent and so rejected the German argument that Germany was entitled to attack Norway.

See also 

 List of Danish military equipment of World War II

 Battle of Kristiansand
List of Norwegian military equipment of World War II
 British occupation of the Faroe Islands in World War II
List of British military equipment of World War II
List of French World War II military equipment
 Kampf um Norwegen – Feldzug 1940 (1940 documentary film)
 List of German military equipment of World War II
Luftwaffe Order of Battle April 1940

 Occupation of Norway by Nazi Germany
 Operation Juno
 Operation Weserübung's effects on Sweden
 Timeline of the Norwegian Campaign

Notes

References

Bibliography

External links 
 The Campaign in Norway
 Halford MacKinder's Necessary War
 The Operation against Danish Jews in October 1943
 The Fate of the Jews of Denmark
 Judgement: The Invasion of Denmark and Norway

Conflicts in 1940
Amphibious operations involving Germany
Battles and operations of World War II involving Denmark
Battles and operations of World War II involving Norway
Weserübung
Naval battles and operations of World War II involving the United Kingdom
Aerial operations and battles of World War II involving the United Kingdom
Military history of Denmark during World War II
Military history of Norway during World War II
Norwegian campaign
1940 in Norway
1940 in Denmark
Naval battles and operations of the European theatre of World War II
Aerial operations and battles of World War II
Military operations directly affecting Sweden during World War II
Code names
World War II invasions
Invasions by Germany
Invasions of Denmark
Invasions of Norway
Amphibious operations of World War II
Germany–Norway military relations
Denmark–Germany military relations
Military operations of World War II